Zygotritonia  is a genus of herbaceous, perennial and bulbous plants in the family Iridaceae. It contains four species distributed throughout sub-Saharan Africa. The genus name is derived from the word zygomorphic (meaning bilabiate), and the apparent resemblance to some species in the genus Tritonia.

Species
The list of Zygotritonia species, with their complete name and authority, and their geographic distribution is given below.

Zygotritonia atropurpurea Goldblatt (2019). Northern Zambia.
Zygotritonia bongensis (Pax) Mildbr., Bot. Jahrb. Syst. 58: 230 (1923). West Tropical Africa to Socotra.
Zygotritonia hysterantha Goldblatt, Bull. Mus. Natl. Hist. Nat., B, Adansonia, IV, 11: 208 (1989). Central African Republic.
Zygotritonia nyassana Mildbr., Bot. Jahrb. Syst. 58: 231 (1923). Western Tanzania to Zambia. 
Zygotritonia praecox Stapf, Hooker's Icon. Pl. 32: t. 3120 (1933). Western Tropical Africa, Western Ethiopia.

References

Bibliography 

 

Iridaceae genera
Iridaceae